Ayyalur is a panchayat town in Dindigul district at  Madurai Region in the state of Tamil Nadu, India.

Demographics
 India census, Ayyalur had a population of 14,362. Males constitute 50% of the population and females 50%. Ayyalur has an average literacy rate of 53%, lower than the national average of 59.5%; with 60% of the males and 40% of females literate. 12% of the population is under 6 years of age. It is 25km from Dindigal city via the NH45.

References

Cities and towns in Dindigul district